North Armagh was a UK Parliament constituency in Ireland which returned one Member of Parliament from 1885 to 1922, using the first past the post electoral system.

Boundaries and boundary changes
This constituency comprised the northern part of County Armagh.

1885–1922: The barony of Oneilland East, and that part of the barony of Oneilland West contained within the parishes of Clonfeacle, Drumcree, Killyman, Newry and Tartaraghan, the parish of Loughgall excluding the townlands of Drumnasoo and Turcarra, and the townlands of Annaboe, Annahugh, Ballintaggart, Ballyhagan, Ballytrue, Ballywilly, Bottlehill, Castleraw, Clonroot, Creenagh, Derryloughan, Drumard Primate, Kilmacanty, Kilmore, Kincon, Lissheffield, Lurgancot, Money and Tullymore in the parish of Kilmore.

Until 1918 it was bounded to the north-east by South Antrim, to the north-west by East Tyrone, to the west by South Tyrone, to the south by Mid Armagh and to the east by West Down. From 1918 to 1922 the adjoining constituencies were the same, except that North-East Tyrone replaced East Tyrone.

Prior to the 1885 United Kingdom general election and from the dissolution of Parliament in 1922 the area was part of the Armagh constituency.

Politics
The constituency was a predominantly Conservative then Unionist area. There were few contested elections. In 1918 the Unionists defeated Sinn Féin by about 3 to 1. This was the first contested election for the seat since a 1906 by-election.

The First Dáil
Sinn Féin contested the general election of 1918 on the platform that instead of taking up any seats they won in the United Kingdom Parliament, they would establish a revolutionary assembly in Dublin. In republican theory every MP elected in Ireland was a potential Deputy to this assembly. In practice only the Sinn Féin members accepted the offer.

The revolutionary First Dáil assembled on 21 January 1919 and last met on 10 May 1921. The First Dáil, according to a resolution passed on 10 May 1921, was formally dissolved on the assembling of the Second Dáil. This took place on 16 August 1921.

In 1921 Sinn Féin decided to use the UK authorised elections for the Northern Ireland House of Commons and the House of Commons of Southern Ireland as a poll for the Irish Republic's Second Dáil. Armagh North, in republican theory, was incorporated in a four-member Dáil constituency of Armagh.

Members of Parliament

Elections

Elections in the 1910s

Elections in the 1900s

Elections in the 1890s

Elections in the 1880s

See also
 List of UK Parliament Constituencies in Ireland and Northern Ireland
 Redistribution of Seats (Ireland) Act 1918
 List of MPs elected in the 1918 United Kingdom general election
 List of Dáil Éireann constituencies in Ireland (historic)
 Members of the 1st Dáil

References

Westminster constituencies in County Armagh (historic)
Dáil constituencies in Northern Ireland (historic)
Constituencies of the Parliament of the United Kingdom established in 1885
Constituencies of the Parliament of the United Kingdom disestablished in 1922